The WPA World Nine-ball Championship is an annual professional nine-ball pool tournament contested since 1990. The championship is sanctioned by the World Pool-Billiard Association (WPA) and principally sponsored and organised by Matchroom Sport, who provide the event's official website branded as World Pool Championship.  The championship is divided into men's, women's and wheelchair divisions.

History

In the summer of 1989, the World Pool-Billiard Association (WPA) began plans for a world championship tournament. The group sent invitations, rules, sports regulations and by-laws. Reception was positive, and a provisional Board was created.

In March 1990, the inaugural WPA World Nine-ball Championship was held in Bergheim, Germany. The playing field included 32 men and 16 women in separate divisions, and has since become an annual event. The event was organised solely by the WPA from this inauguration through 1999.

In July 1999, Matchroom Sport attempted to get involved with the organisation of the event, but their bid failed. The WPA event was played in Alicante, Spain, and won by Nick Varner of the United States. Broadcast on ESPN, it was the first pro nine-ball championship to be televised. Matchroom Sport, meanwhile, instead organised tournament called the "World Professional Pool Championship", a competing and non-WPA-sanctioned event in Cardiff, Wales, which was won by Efren Reyes of the Philippines.

In 2000, Matchroom and the WPA agreed that tournaments would merge into a single official world championship. The WPA also agreed to recognise the results of the 1999 Matchroom event, meaning that official listings show both Varner and Reyes as 1999 world champions. Matchroom changed its promotional name for the event to the "World Pool Championship", dropping the word "professional" from the title. The event remained in Cardiff through 2003.

In 2001, the number of competitors in the men's division was increased to 128 and a men's division first prize raised to $65,000.

The 2004 and 2005 events were held in Taiwan, with a men's division first prize of $75,000 as of 2004.

In the 2006 event, the Philippines became the host country for two years. All matches became alternating- all the way from the group stages to the finals. Men's division first prize escalated to $100,000. In 2007, the event ran from November 3–11, and Daryl Peach of the England was the victor. Because of the global late-2000s recession the championship did not reappear on the calendar in 2008. For some time neither Matchroom nor the WPA released any predictions regarding its reinstatement, and no 2009 event was held, either.

After a two-year hiatus, the tournament returned as the 2010 WPA World Nine-ball Championship in Doha, Qatar. Francisco Bustamante of the Philippines won the 2010 title. The event was then held annually in Doha through 2019. After not being contested in 2020 due to the COVID-19 pandemic, the championship resumed in 2021 in Milton Keynes, England. The 2022 edition is scheduled for April 6–10 in Milton Keynes.

Winners

Records 
 Earl Strickland holds the record for winning the WPA World Nine-ball Championship the most times: three. (1990, 1991, 2002).
 Earl Strickland holds the record for the most consecutive wins: two. (1990, 1991).
 Albin Ouschan holds the record for the most final appearances: four. (2014, 2016, 2021, 2022).
 The oldest pool player to ever win the tournament to date is Nick Varner of the United States, at 51 years old at the time of his victory, The youngest is Wu Jiaqing of Chinese Taipei, aged 16 years old at the time of his victory.

Top performers

 Active participants are shown in bold.
 Only players who reached the final are included.
 Final stage appearances relates to players who reach the last 16 players of the event.
 In the event of identical records, players are sorted in alphabetical order by first name.

See also

References

External links
World Pool-Billiard Association

 
World championships in pool
Recurring sporting events established in 1990
Annual sporting events